(German for "people's day of mourning") is a commemoration day in Germany two Sundays before the first day of Advent. It commemorates members of the armed forces of all nations and civilians who died in armed conflicts, to include victims of violent oppression. It was first observed in its modern form in 1952.

History 

In 1893, the Kingdom of Prussia consolidated many days of repentance and prayer celebrated by various Protestant denominations and in various German-speaking regions into , a national work-holiday celebrated on the Wednesday before November 23.

It was first held in 1922 in the Reichstag. In 1926,  became a feature on what Catholics considered  (the second Sunday of Lent.)

In the Weimar years,  was not a legal holiday for several reasons:
Over the years this led to local differences in regulations, dates, and interpretations.
 The two largest Christian churches were not in agreement over a suitable date for remembrance since each already had its own day for remembering the dead in November: the Catholic All Souls' Day and the Protestant .

(1934–45) 
On 27 February 1934, the National Socialists introduced national holiday legislation to create  ("Day of Commemoration of Heroes"), cementing the observance. In the process, they completely changed the character of the holiday: the emphasis shifted to hero worship rather than remembering the dead. Furthermore, five years later the Nazis abolished  as a non-working day and moved its commemoration to the following Sunday, to further the war effort.

On 21 March 1943, Adolf Hitler visited the Zeughaus Berlin, the old armory on Unter den Linden, to inspect captured Soviet weapons as part of his Heldengedenktag speech and ceremony in the wake of the catastrophic German defeat at Battle of Stalingrad. A group of top Nazi and leading military officials—among them Hermann Göring, Heinrich Himmler, Field Marshal Wilhelm Keitel, and Grand Admiral Karl Dönitz—were present as well. As an expert, Oberst Rudolf Christoph Freiherr von Gersdorff was to guide Hitler on a tour of the exhibition. Moments after Hitler entered the museum, Gersdorff set off two ten-minute delayed fuses on explosive devices hidden in his coat pockets. His plan was to throw himself around Hitler in a death embrace that would blow them both up. A detailed plan for a coup d'état had been worked out and was ready to go; but, contrary to expectations, Hitler raced through the museum in less than ten minutes. After he had left the building, Gersdorff was able to defuse the devices in a public bathroom "at the last second." After the attempt, he was immediately transferred back to the Eastern Front where he managed to evade suspicion.

Joseph Goebbels, as Propaganda Minister, issued guidelines on content and implementation, instructing that flags no longer be flown at half-mast. The last  was celebrated in 1945.

Modern form 
After the end of World War II,  was observed in its original form in West Germany, beginning in 1948. Its scope was also broadened to include those who died due to the violence of an oppressive government, not just those who died in war.

Observation 
An official observation of  takes place in the German . The President of Germany traditionally gives a speech with the Chancellor, the cabinet and the diplomatic corps present. The national anthem and the song "" ("I had a comrade") are then played. Most  also hold their own ceremonies; veterans usually organize ceremonies that include a procession from the respective Church service to a war memorial, prayer by the pastor, speeches by the mayor and the veterans' chairmen, a military guard of honor, several wreaths are laid, and ""; where available, also with the attendance of a  officer as official representative.

Because of the relation to Advent, the date is the Sunday nearest 16 November, i.e. in the period from 13 November to 19 November.

References

External links 

Public holidays in Germany
German War Graves Commission
Sunday observances
Veterans' affairs in Germany
Observances honoring victims of war
November observances
Autumn events in Germany
Veterans days
German flag flying days